A Different World is a television spin-off of The Cosby Show set at Hillman College, the alma mater of Clair and Dr. Heathcliff Huxtable. It ran for six seasons on NBC, airing a total of 141 episodes, including three hour-long episodes. The last three episodes aired in syndication, bringing the total to 144.

Series overview

Episodes

Season 1 (1987–88)

Season 2 (1988–89)

Season 3 (1989–90)

Season 4 (1990–91)

Season 5 (1991–92)

Season 6 (1992–93)

References

External links
 

Lists of American sitcom episodes